St. Francis Xavier Catholic High School is an English Catholic high school that serves the Clarence-Rockland community in Eastern Ontario. It is located at 1235 Russell Road, southeast of the village of Hammond. The school's mascot is the Falcons. It is home to 450 students across the Prescott-Russell County. The school opened in 1993. Check out the Virtual Tour.

See also
 Catholic District School Board of Eastern Ontario
 St. Francis Xavier CHS Website

Clarence-Rockland
Catholic secondary schools in Ontario